The Brooke family is an English family that ruled the Raj of Sarawak from 1841 until 1946.

Rajahs of Sarawak:
James Brooke (1841–1868)
Charles Brooke (1868–1917)
Charles Vyner  Brooke (1917–1946)

Sarawak royalty